The Qin dynasty, or Ch'in dynasty, was the first dynasty of Imperial China. Named for its heartland in Qin state, the Qin dynasty arose as a fief of the Western Zhou and endured for over five centuries until 221 BC when it founded its brief empire, which lasted only until 206 BC. It was established in 221 BC when Ying Zheng, who had already been king of Qin since 246 BC, declared himself the First Emperor (Shi Huangdi). 

Qin was a minor power for the early centuries of its existence. The strength of the Qin state was greatly increased by the Legalist reforms of Shang Yang in the fourth century BC, during the Warring States period. In the mid and late third century BC, the Qin state carried out a series of swift conquests, destroying the powerless Zhou dynasty and eventually conquering the other six of the Seven Warring States. Its 15 years was the shortest major dynasty in Chinese history, consisting of only two emperors. Despite its short reign, however, the lessons and strategies of the Qin shaped the Han dynasty and became the starting point of the Chinese imperial system that lasted from 221 BC, with interruption, development, and adaptation, until 1912 (with a brief restoration in 1917).

The Qin sought to create a state unified by structured centralized political power and a large military supported by a stable economy. The central government moved to undercut aristocrats and landowners to gain direct administrative control over the peasantry, who comprised the overwhelming majority of the population and labour force. This allowed ambitious projects involving three hundred thousand peasants and convicts: projects such as connecting walls along the northern border, eventually developing into the Great Wall of China, and a massive new national road system, as well as the city-sized Mausoleum of the First Qin Emperor guarded by the life-sized Terracotta Army.

The Qin introduced a range of reforms such as standardized currency, weights, measures and a uniform system of writing, which aimed to unify the state and promote commerce. Additionally, its military used the most recent weaponry, transportation and tactics, though the government was heavy-handedly bureaucratic. Han Confucians portrayed the legalistic Qin dynasty as a monolithic tyranny, notably citing a purge known as the burning of books and burying of scholars although some modern scholars dispute the veracity of these accounts. Qin created a system of administrating people and land that greatly increased the power of the government to transform environment, and it has been argued that the subsequent impact of this system on East Asia's environments makes Qin's rise an important event in China's environmental history.

When the first emperor died in 210 BC, two of his advisors placed an heir on the throne in an attempt to influence and control the administration of the dynasty. These advisors squabbled among themselves, resulting in both of their deaths and that of the second Qin Emperor. Popular revolt broke out and the weakened empire soon fell to a Chu general, Xiang Yu, who was proclaimed Hegemon-King of Western Chu, and Liu Bang, who founded the Han dynasty.

History

Origins and early development

According to the Records of the Grand Historian, in the 9th century BC, Feizi, a supposed descendant of the ancient political advisor Gao Yao, was granted rule over the settlement of Qin (秦邑) in present-day Qingshui County of Shaanxi. During the rule of King Xiao of Zhou, the eighth king of the Zhou dynasty, this area became known as the state of Qin. In 897 BC, under the Gonghe Regency, the area became a dependency allotted for the purpose of raising and breeding horses. One of Feizi's descendants, Duke Zhuang, became favoured by King Ping of Zhou, the 13th king in that line. As a reward, Zhuang's son, Duke Xiang, was sent eastward as the leader of a war expedition, during which he formally established the Qin.

The state of Qin first began a military expedition into central China in 672 BC, though it did not engage in any serious incursions due to the threat from neighbouring tribesmen. By the dawn of the fourth century BC, however, the neighbouring tribes had all been either subdued or conquered, and the stage was set for the rise of Qin expansionism.

Growth of power

Lord Shang Yang, a Qin statesman of the Warring States period, advocated a philosophy of Legalism, introducing a number of militarily advantageous reforms from 361 BC until his death in 338 BC. 
Yang also helped construct the Qin capital, commencing in the mid-fourth century BC Xianyang. The resulting city greatly resembled the capitals of other Warring States.

Notably, Qin Legalism encouraged practical and ruthless warfare. During the Spring and Autumn period, the prevalent philosophy had dictated war as a gentleman's activity; military commanders were instructed to respect what they perceived to be Heaven's laws in battle. For example, when Duke Xing of the rival state of Song was at war with the state of Chu during the Warring States period, he declined an opportunity to attack the enemy force, commanded by Zhu, while they were crossing a river. After allowing them to cross and marshal their forces, he was decisively defeated in the ensuing battle. When his advisors later admonished him for such excessive courtesy to the enemy, he retorted, "The sage does not crush the feeble, nor give the order for attack until the enemy have formed their ranks."

The Qin disregarded this military tradition, taking advantage of their enemy's weaknesses. A nobleman in the state of Wei accused the Qin state of being "avaricious, perverse, eager for profit, and without sincerity. It knows nothing about etiquette, proper relationships, and virtuous conduct, and if there be an opportunity for material gain, it will disregard its relatives as if they were animals." It was this Legalist thought combined with strong leadership from long-lived rulers, openness to employ talented men from other states, and little internal opposition that gave the Qin such a strong political base.

Another advantage of the Qin was that they had a large, efficient army and capable generals. They utilised the newest developments in weaponry and transportation as well, which many of their enemies lacked. These latter developments allowed greater mobility over several different terrain types which were most common in many regions of China. Thus, in both ideology and practice, the Qin were militarily superior.

Finally, the Qin Empire had a geographical advantage due to its fertility and strategic position, protected by mountains that made the state a natural stronghold. This was the heart of the Guanzhong region, as opposed to the Yangtze River drainage basin, known as Guandong. The warlike nature of the Qin in Guanzhong inspired a Han dynasty adage: "Guanzhong produces generals, while Guandong produces ministers." Its expanded agricultural output helped sustain Qin's large army with food and natural resources; the Wei River canal built in 246 BC was particularly significant in this respect.

Conquest of the Warring States

During the Warring States period preceding the Qin dynasty, the major states vying for dominance were Yan, Zhao, Qi, Chu, Han, Wei and Qin. The rulers of these states styled themselves as kings, rather than using the titles of lower nobility they had previously held. However, none elevated himself to believe that he had the "Mandate of Heaven", as the Zhou kings had claimed, nor that he had the right to offer sacrifices—they left this to the Zhou rulers.

Before their conquest in the fourth and third centuries BC, the Qin suffered several setbacks. Shang Yang was executed in 338 BC by King Huiwen due to a personal grudge harboured from his youth. There was also internal strife over the Qin succession in 307 BC, which decentralised Qin authority somewhat. Qin was defeated by an alliance of the other states in 295 BC, and shortly after suffered another defeat by the state of Zhao, because the majority of their army was then defending against the Qi. The aggressive statesman Fan Sui (范雎), however, soon came to power as prime minister even as the problem of the succession was resolved, and he began an expansionist policy that had originated in Jin and Qi, which prompted the Qin to attempt to conquer the other states.

The Qin were swift in their assault on the other states. They first attacked the Han, directly east, and took their capital city of Xinzheng in 230 BC. They then struck northward; the state of Zhao surrendered in 228 BC, and the northernmost state of Yan followed, falling in 226 BC. Next, Qin armies launched assaults to the east, and later the south as well; they took the Wei city of Daliang (now called Kaifeng) in 225 BC and forced the Chu to surrender by 223 BC. Lastly, they deposed the Zhou dynasty's remnants in Luoyang and conquered the Qi, taking the city of Linzi in 221 BC.

When the conquests were complete in 221 BC, King Zhengwho had first assumed the throne of the Qin state at age 9became the effective ruler of China. The subjugation of the six states was done by King Zheng who had used efficient persuasion and exemplary strategy. He solidified his position as sole ruler with the abdication of his prime minister, Lü Buwei. The states made by the emperor were assigned to officials dedicated to the task rather than place the burden on people from the royal family. He then combined the titles of the earlier Three Sovereigns and Five Emperors into his new name: Shi Huangdi or "First Emperor". The newly declared emperor ordered all weapons not in the possession of the Qin to be confiscated and melted down. The resulting metal was sufficient to build twelve large ornamental statues at the Qin's newly declared capital, Xianyang.

Southward expansion

In 214 BC, Qin Shi Huang secured his boundaries to the north with a fraction (100,000 men) of his large army, and sent the majority (500,000 men) of his army south to conquer the territory of the southern tribes. Prior to the events leading to Qin dominance over China, they had gained possession of much of Sichuan to the southwest. The Qin army was unfamiliar with the jungle terrain, and it was defeated by the southern tribes' guerrilla warfare tactics with over 100,000 men lost. However, in the defeat Qin was successful in building a canal to the south, which they used heavily for supplying and reinforcing their troops during their second attack to the south. Building on these gains, the Qin armies conquered the coastal lands surrounding Guangzhou, and took the provinces of Fuzhou and Guilin. They struck as far south as Hanoi. After these victories in the south, Qin Shi Huang moved over 100,000 prisoners and exiles to colonize the newly conquered area. In terms of extending the boundaries of his empire, the First Emperor was extremely successful in the south.

Campaigns against the Xiongnu

However, while the empire at times was extended to the north, the Qin could rarely hold on to the land for long. The tribes of these locations, collectively called the Hu by the Qin, were free from Chinese rule during the majority of the dynasty. Prohibited from trading with Qin dynasty peasants, the Xiongnu tribe living in the Ordos region in northwest China often raided them instead, prompting the Qin to retaliate. After a military campaign led by General Meng Tian, the region was conquered in 215 BC and agriculture was established; the peasants, however, were discontented and later revolted. The succeeding Han dynasty also expanded into the Ordos due to overpopulation, but depleted their resources in the process. Indeed, this was true of the dynasty's borders in multiple directions; modern Xinjiang, Tibet, Manchuria, Inner Mongolia, and regions to the southeast were foreign to the Qin, and even areas over which they had military control were culturally distinct.

Fall from power

Three assassination attempts were made on Qin Shi Huang, leading him to become paranoid and obsessed with immortality. He died in 210 BC, while on a trip to the far eastern reaches of his empire in an attempt to procure an elixir of immortality from Taoist magicians, who claimed the elixir was stuck on an island guarded by a sea monster. The chief eunuch, Zhao Gao, and the prime minister, Li Si, hid the news of his death upon their return until they were able to alter his will to place on the throne the dead emperor's most pliable son, Huhai, who took the name of Qin Er Shi. They believed that they would be able to manipulate him to their own ends, and thus effectively control the empire. Qin Er Shi was, indeed, inept and pliable. He executed many ministers and imperial princes, continued massive building projects (one of his most extravagant projects was lacquering the city walls), enlarged the army, increased taxes, and arrested messengers who brought him bad news. As a result, men from all over China revolted, attacking officials, raising armies, and declaring themselves kings of seized territories.

During this time, Li Si and Zhao Gao fell out, and Li Si was executed. Zhao Gao decided to force Qin Er Shi to commit suicide due to Qin Er Shi's incompetence. Upon this, Ziying, a nephew of Qin Er Shi, ascended the throne, and immediately executed Zhao Gao. Ziying, seeing that increasing unrest was growing among the people and that many local officials had declared themselves kings, attempted to cling to his throne by declaring himself one king among all the others. He was undermined by his ineptitude, however, and popular revolt broke out in 209 BC. When Chu rebels under the lieutenant Liu Bang attacked, a state in such turmoil could not hold for long. Ziying was defeated near the Wei River in 207 BC and surrendered shortly after; he was executed by the Chu leader Xiang Yu. The Qin capital was destroyed the next year, and this is considered by historians to be the end of the Qin Empire. Liu Bang then betrayed and defeated Xiang Yu, declaring himself Emperor Gaozu of the new Han dynasty on 28 February 202 BC. Despite the short duration of the Qin dynasty, it was very influential on the structure of future dynasties.

Culture and society

Domestic life
The aristocracy of the Qin were largely similar in their culture and daily life. Regional variations in culture were considered a symbol of the lower classes. This stemmed from the Zhou and was seized upon by the Qin, as such variations were seen as contrary to the unification that the government strove to achieve. 

Commoners and rural villagers, who made up over 90% of the population, very rarely left the villages or farmsteads where they were born. Forms of employment differed by region, though farming was almost universally common. Professions were hereditary; a father's employment was passed to his eldest son after he died. The Lüshi Chunqiu gave examples of how, when commoners are obsessed with material wealth, instead of the idealism of a man who "makes things serve him", they were "reduced to the service of things".

Peasants were rarely figured in literature during the Qin dynasty and afterwards; scholars and others of more elite status preferred the excitement of cities and the lure of politics. One notable exception to this was Shen Nong, the so-called "Divine Father", who taught that households should grow their own food. "If in one's prime he does not plow, someone in the world will grow hungry. If in one's prime she does not weave, someone in the world will be cold." The Qin encouraged this; a ritual was performed once every few years that consisted of important government officials taking turns with the plow on a special field, to create a simulation of government interest and activity within agriculture.

Architecture

Warring States-era architecture had several definitive aspects. City walls, used for defense, were made longer, and indeed several secondary walls were also sometimes built to separate the different districts. Versatility in federal structures was emphasized, to create a sense of authority and absolute power. Architectural elements such as high towers, pillar gates, terraces, and high buildings amply conveyed this.

Philosophy and literature

The written language of the Qin was logographic, as that of the Zhou had been. As one of his most influential achievements in life, prime minister Li Si standardized the writing system to be of uniform size and shape across the whole country. This would have a unifying effect on the Chinese culture for thousands of years. He is also credited with creating the "small seal script" style of calligraphy, which serves as a basis for modern Chinese and is still used in cards, posters, and advertising.

During the Warring States period, the Hundred Schools of Thought comprised many different philosophies proposed by Chinese scholars. In 221 BC, however, the First Emperor conquered all of the states and governed with a single philosophy, Legalism. At least one school of thought, Mohism, was eradicated, though the reason is not known. Despite the Qin's state ideology and Mohism being similar in certain regards, it is possible that Mohists were sought and killed by the state's armies due to paramilitary activities.

Confucius's school of thought, called Confucianism, was also influential during the Warring States period, as well as throughout much of the later Zhou dynasty and early imperial periods. This school of thought had a so-called Confucian canon of literature, known as the "six classics": the Odes, Documents, Ritual, Music, Spring and Autumn Annals, and Changes, which embodied Chinese literature at the time.

During the Qin dynasty, Confucianism—along with all other non-Legalist philosophies, such as Daoism—were suppressed by the First Emperor; early Han dynasty emperors did the same. Legalism denounced the feudal system and encouraged severe punishments, particularly when the emperor was disobeyed. Individuals' rights were devalued when they conflicted with the government's or the ruler's wishes, and merchants and scholars were considered unproductive, fit for elimination.

One of the more drastic allegations, however the infamous burning of books and burying of scholars incident, does not appear to be true, as it was not mentioned until many years later. The Han dynasty historian, Sima Qian wrote that First Emperor, in an attempt to consolidate power, in 213 BC ordered the burning of all books advocating viewpoints that challenged Legalism or the state, and also stipulated that all scholars who refused to submit their books to be burned would be executed by premature burial. Only texts considered productive were to be preserved, mostly those that discussed pragmatic subjects, such as agriculture, divination, and medicine. However, Sinologists now argue that the "burying of scholars" is not literally true, as the term probably meant simply "put to death".

Government and military

The Qin government was highly bureaucratic, and was administered by a hierarchy of officials, all serving the First Emperor. The Qin put into practice the teachings of Han Feizi, allowing the First Emperor to control all of his territories, including those recently conquered. All aspects of life were standardized, from measurements and language to more practical details, such as the length of chariot axles.

The states made by the emperor were assigned to officials dedicated to the task rather than placing the burden on people from the royal family. Zheng and his advisors also introduced new laws and practices that ended feudalism in China, replacing it with a centralized, bureaucratic government. The form of government created by the first emperor and his advisors was used by later dynasties to structure their own government. Under this system, both the military and government thrived, as talented individuals could be more easily identified in the transformed society. Later Chinese dynasties emulated the Qin government for its efficiency, despite its being condemned by Confucian philosophy. There were incidences of abuse, however, with one example having been recorded in the "Records of Officialdom". A commander named Hu ordered his men to attack peasants in an attempt to increase the number of "bandits" he had killed; his superiors, likely eager to inflate their records as well, allowed this.

Qin Shi Huang also improved the strong military, despite the fact that it had already undergone extensive reforms. The military used the most advanced weaponry of the time. It was first used mostly in bronze form, but by the third century BC, kingdoms such as Chu and Qin were using iron and/or steel swords. The demand for this metal resulted in improved bellows. The crossbow had been introduced in the fifth century BC and was more powerful and accurate than the composite bows used earlier. It could also be rendered ineffective by removing two pins, which prevented enemies from capturing a working crossbow.

The Qin also used improved methods of transportation and tactics. The state of Zhao had first replaced chariots with cavalry in 307 BC, but the change was swiftly adopted by the other states because cavalry had greater mobility over the terrain of China.

The First Emperor developed plans to fortify his northern border, to protect against nomadic invasions. The result was the initial construction of what later became the Great Wall of China, which was built by joining and strengthening the walls made by the feudal lords, which would be expanded and rebuilt multiple times by later dynasties, also in response to threats from the north. Another project built during Qin Shi Huang's rule was the Terracotta army, intended to protect the emperor after his death. The Terracotta Army was inconspicuous due to its underground location, and was not discovered until 1974.

Religion

The dominant religious belief in China during the reign of the Qin, and, in fact, during much of early imperial China, was focused on the shen (roughly translating to "spirits" or "gods"), yin ("shadows"), and the realm they were said to live in. The Chinese offered animal sacrifices in an attempt to contact this other world, which they believed to be parallel to the earthly one. The dead were said to have simply moved from one world to the other. The rituals mentioned, as well as others, served two purposes: to ensure that the dead journeyed and stayed in the other realm, and to receive blessings from the spirit realm.

Religious practices were usually held in local shrines and sacred areas, which contained sacrificial altars. During a sacrifice or other ritual, the senses of all participants and witnesses would be dulled and blurred with smoke, incense, and music. The lead sacrificer would fast and meditate before a sacrifice to further blur his senses and increase the likelihood of perceiving otherworldly phenomena. Other participants were similarly prepared, though not as rigorously.

Such blurring of the senses was also a factor in the practice of spirit intermediaries, or mediumship. Practitioners of the art would fall into trances or dance to perform supernatural tasks. These people would often rise to power as a result of their art—Luan Da, a Han dynasty medium, was granted rule over 2,000 households. Noted Han historian Sima Qian was scornful of such practices, dismissing them as foolish trickery.

Divination—to predict and/or influence the future—was yet another form of religious practice. An ancient practice that was common during the Qin dynasty was cracking bones or turtle shells to gain knowledge of the future. The forms of divination which sprang up during early imperial China were diverse, though observing natural phenomena was a common method. Comets, eclipses, and droughts were considered omens of things to come.

Etymology of China

The name 'Qin' is believed to be the etymological ancestor of the modern-day European name of the country, China. The word probably made its way into the Indo-Aryan languages first as 'Cina' or 'Sina' and then into Greek and Latin as 'Sinai' or 'Thinai'. It was then transliterated into English and French as 'China' and 'Chine'. This etymology is dismissed by some scholars, who suggest that 'Sina' in Sanskrit evolved much earlier before the Qin dynasty. 'Jin', a state controlled by the Zhou dynasty in seventh century BC, is another possible origin. Others argued for the state of Jing (荆, another name for Chu), as well as other polities in the early period as the source of the name.

Sovereigns

Qin Shi Huang was the first Chinese sovereign to proclaim himself "Emperor", after unifying China in 221 BC. That year is therefore generally taken by historians to be the start of the "Qin dynasty" which lasted for fifteen years until 207 when it was cut short by civil wars.

Imperial family tree

'

Notes

References

Citations

Sources

Further reading

External links 
 

 
 

 
Dynasties in Chinese history
Iron Age Asia
Former countries in East Asia
States and territories established in the 3rd century BC
221 BC
220s BC establishments
States and territories disestablished in the 3rd century BC
1st-millennium BC disestablishments in China
Qin Shi Huang
Former monarchies of East Asia
Former empires